Ribosomal protein S6 kinase, 90kDa, polypeptide 6 is a protein in humans that is encoded by the RPS6KA6 gene.

This gene encodes a member of ribosomal S6 kinase family, serine-threonin protein kinases which are regulated by growth factors. The encoded protein may be distinct from other members of this family, however, as studies suggest it is not growth factor dependent and may not participate in the same signaling pathways. [provided by RefSeq, Jan 2010].

References

Further reading 

Genes on human chromosome X